Kong Hwa School (abbreviation: KHS;), is a co-educational and Special Assistance Plan (SAP) primary school in Singapore. It is one of the six Singapore Hokkien Huay Kuan schools, along with Tao Nan School, Ai Tong School, Chongfu Primary School, Nan Chiau Primary School and Nan Chiau High School.

Kong Hwa School has been offering the Bi-Cultural Enrichment Programme (BiCEP) since 2007, which encourages students to be bilingual. The school is currently situated along Guillemard Road.

School crest
The two traditional Chinese characters, form the torch in the middle of the school crest. The torch is in red and symbolises the "Flame of Knowledge". The yellow background symbolises the radiance of the burning torch which reflects the school's pursuit for academic excellence.

History

Kong Hwa School was founded by the Singapore Hokkien Huay Kuan (SHHK) in 1953. This was immediately after the Japanese Occupation, when the committee members of the SHHK realised the urgent need for education and that there was a drastic shortage of schools in Singapore. The school currently stands at its original location along Guillemard Road- which was donated by Tan Lark Sye.

Initially, Kong Hwa School was named ‘Kong Chian School’ after Lee Kong Chian made a personal donation of $300,000. Further reasoning and support for the name included the Chinese proverb  “” (guāng qián yù hòu), which implies the school wanting its students to be high achievers, defending the honor of their ancestors and doing things for the benefit of future generations.

However, Lee, who was in London at the time, sent a letter to the chairman of the SHHK, Tan Lark Sye. He said that times were progressing, and that philanthropy should be a common occurrence and not something so rare that it needs to be celebrated. Thus, Lee requested that the SHHK to rename the school. In response to his repeated pleas, the SHHK officially changed the school's name to Kong Hwa School on 1 May 1953.

Culture

Uniform
Boys wear a white shirt and khaki shorts. Girls wear a white sleeveless blouse and a knee-length accordion-pleated skirt. Both uniforms have the school crest emblazoned on the left. While school shoes and socks can be purchased, any white-based shoes or socks (except ankle socks) are allowed.

Sports' Day
Every year, there is a sports day event held by the Singapore Hokkien Huay Kuan. All affiliated primary schools, (i.e. Tao Nan School, Ai Tong School, Chongfu Primary School, and Nan Chiau Primary School in addition to Kong Hwa School) participate in this event.

Architectural features
The main concept of the Kong Hwa School building is based on the “I-Ching”, or Classic of Changes, an ancient Chinese classical text. This text is more than three thousand years old, and speaks of the five aspects of balanced development, “德、智、體、群、美” or morality, wit, health, society, and beauty. It encompasses concepts that regulate a wide spectrum of disciplines from human nature to algebra.

Main Parade Square
The sixty four hexagrams of the “I Ching” were physically inscribed in the tiling patterns. The square in turn faces two wall bearing the school motto, i.e. sincerity and perseverance. The school assembly is conducted in this oriental setting.

Amphitheater
The amphitheater was designed to provide an environment for promoting Western culture in the area of performing arts and public skills.

Chinese Garden
It has also made provision for creativity in teaching and learning with the construction of the “Kong Hwa Garden” which is an artistic replica of a typical Jiangnan-styled Chinese garden design. This place, which serves as an area for students to rest and relax, is also meant to be a source of inspiration and promotion of Chinese culture.

Yin and Yang as Inspiration
The design of the Kong Hwa School building was based on the Chinese concept of Yin and Yang– that is, balance. As such, many aspects of society were taken into account. The premise of the obvious Chinese cultural architectural features were to act as a balance to the internal components of the school being influenced by Western science and technological advancements, and cultural norms such as performing at the amphitheater. Simply put, the Kong Hwa School building was designed on the ideal of the spirit of collective collaboration, with the belief that the environment is essential to the integration of Eastern and Western cultures in the school.

One example would be that the school places equal emphasis on the arts and sports– there are dedicated facilities for training in the sports (especially in table tennis and badminton), and there is a small wing where the rooms are reserved for musical purposes such as the Chinese Orchestra or band.

References

External links
 

Primary schools in Singapore
Singapore Hokkien Huay Kuan schools
Educational institutions established in 1953
1953 establishments in Malaya